The National Federation of Insurance Workers (NFIW) was a trade union federation of insurance trade unions in the United Kingdom.

The federation was established in 1919, and by 1927 its affiliates had a total of 19,863 members, with around a third of the total being members of the Prudential Staff Union.  While its members largely operated independently, the federation represented them at the Trades Union Congress.  It continued to grow, and by 1938 represented 24,168 workers.  Its affiliates as of 1947 were:

 Britannic Field Staff Association
 Liverpool Victoria Workers' Union
 London and Manchester Field Staff Association
 National Federation of Scottish Legal Life Insurance Agents
 National Pearl Federation
 National Union of Pearl Agents
 Prudential Staff Union
 Refuge Field Staff Association
 Royal Co-operative Agents' and Employees' Union
 Royal Liver Employees' Union
 Royal London Staff Association

The NFIW merged with the rival National Amalgamated Union of Life Insurance Workers in 1964, forming the National Union of Insurance Workers.

General Secretaries
1919: J. P. Hutchings
1929: F. D. W. Ross
1941: P. W. Auton and A. Kennard
1945: P. W. Auton and A. Barnett
1947: P. W. Auton
1959: Thomas Scrafton

References

Defunct trade unions of the United Kingdom
1919 establishments in the United Kingdom
Trade unions established in 1919
Trade unions disestablished in 1964
Trade unions based in London
Insurance industry trade unions